Anthony Husbands (born January 13, 1956 on Trinidad) is a retired sprinter from Trinidad and Tobago who specialized in the 200 metres.

He attended the Essex Community College, Maryland, USA.

Achievements

External links
Best of Trinidad

1956 births
Living people
Trinidad and Tobago male sprinters
Athletes (track and field) at the 1976 Summer Olympics
Olympic athletes of Trinidad and Tobago
Central American and Caribbean Games gold medalists for Trinidad and Tobago
Central American and Caribbean Games silver medalists for Trinidad and Tobago
Competitors at the 1978 Central American and Caribbean Games
Athletes (track and field) at the 1978 Commonwealth Games
Commonwealth Games competitors for Trinidad and Tobago
Central American and Caribbean Games medalists in athletics